Bourek is a 2015 American-Cypriot comedy film directed by Vladan Nikolic, starring William Leroy, Robert Rees and Marios Iannou.

Cast
 William Leroy as W.C. Rupperts
  as Eleni
 Robert Rees as Cal
 Marios Iannou as Adem
 Sergej Trifunović as Mirko
 Branislav Trifunović as Slavko
 Paul Sevigny as Pastor

Release
The film was released in the United States on 29 April 2016.

Reception
Jeannette Catsoulis of The New York Times called the acting "fair-to-middling" and the plot "enervated" while praising the cinematography.

Robert Abele of the Los Angeles Times wrote that while the film is "well-meaning", it is "woefully lacking in dimension or urgency", and called it the "movie equivalent of a scenic tourist trap".

The Hollywood Reporter wrote that the film "cross-cultural good vibes and occasional food porn do little to spice up the picture’s limp jokes and reheated hijinks".

References

External links
 
 

American comedy films
Cypriot comedy films
2015 comedy films